Euthalia adonia   is a butterfly of the family Nymphalidae (Limenitidinae). It is found in the Indomalayan realm.<ref>[http://ftp.funet.fi/pub/sci/bio/life/insecta/lepidoptera/ditrysia/papilionoidea/nymphalidae/limenitidinae/euthalia/ " Euthalia  " Hübner, [1819"] at Markku Savela's Lepidoptera and Some Other Life Forms</ref>

SubspeciesE. a. adonia Java,  BaliE. a. sapitana Fruhstorfer, 1899 LombokE. a. princesa Fruhstorfer, 1899 Philippines (Palawan)E. a. montana Fruhstorfer, 1899 BorneoE. a. pura  Fruhstorfer, 1904 BaweanE. a. sumatrana Fruhstorfer, 1904 SumatraE. a. beata  Fruhstorfer, 1905.Thailand, Langkawi IslandE. a. baliensis Jurriaanse & Volbeda, 1924 BaliE. a. pinwilli  Pendlebury & Corbet, 1938 Peninsular Malaya, SingaporeE. a. kangeana''  Talbot, 1943 Kangean Island

References

Butterflies described in 1780
adonia